The 2004 FC Spartak Moscow season was the club's 13th season in the Russian Premier League season. Spartak finished the season in 8th position, and were knocked out of the 2004–05 Russian Cup by Metallurg Lipetsk at the Round of 32 stage. In Europe, Spartak where knockout of the 2003–04 UEFA Cup by Mallorca in the Third Round, whilst reaching the Third Round of the 2004 UEFA Intertoto Cup where they were knocked out by Villarreal.

Season events
Prior to the start of the season, Yegor Titov was handed a 12-month ban from football for failing a drugs test after Russia's 0–0 against Wales on 15 November 2003.

On 30 August, Nevio Scala was sacked as manager of Spartak, with Aleksandrs Starkovs appointed as his replacement.

Squad

On loan

Left club during season

Transfers

In

Out

Loans out

Released

Competitions

UEFA Cup

Premier League

Results by round

Results

League table

Russian Cup

2004-05

UEFA Intertoto Cup

Squad statistics

Appearances and goals

|-
|colspan="14"|Players away from the club on loan:

|-
|colspan="14"|Players who appeared for Spartak Moscow but left during the season:

|}

Goal scorers

Clean sheets

Disciplinary record

References

FC Spartak Moscow seasons
Spartak Moscow